Nonni and Manni is an adventure children's television series produced as a joint venture between Iceland and West Germany. It debuted on 26 December 1988 on West Germany's ZDF channel and lasted for six episodes with the last one being aired on 1 January 1989.

The story was based on the eponymous book written by the popular Icelandic children's author Jón Sveinsson, nicknamed "Nonni", who had written several books inspired by his own experiences of growing up alongside his brother Ármann, nicknamed "Manni". The filming for the series took place in Iceland, West Germany and Norway.

Plot
Twelve-year-old Nonni (Garðar Thór Cortes) and his eight-year-old brother Manni (Einar Örn Einarsson) live with their mother Sigrid (Lisa Harrow) and their grandmother (Concha Hidalgo) on a small farm in 1869 Iceland. Before Manni was even born, the boys' father had gone to South America in search of work to support his family, and they are still awaiting his return.

A stranger by the name of Harald Helgasson (Luc Merenda) appears in town one day. He presents himself as the boys' father's best friend and informs them that their father had died of a fever. Before he died, he made Harald promise he would return to Iceland to look after his family. Harald helps the family by working on the farm and becomes a close friend to the boys who immediately take a liking to Harald and start to see him as somewhat of a father figure.

Magnus Hansson (Stuart Wilson) is a local businessman who is in love with Sigrid and has been trying to convince her to marry him. Magnus dislikes Harald due to the close relationship that Harald has been developing with the family and starts becoming increasingly upset over this. When another rich local businessman is killed, Magnus accuses Harald of murder. Upon the advice of the family, Harald flees into the mountains and hides from the authorities while Nonni and Manni, who firmly believe in Harald's innocence, expose themselves to danger and adventure while trying to keep Harald safe and prove him innocent.

References

External links

1988 German television series debuts
1989 German television series endings
Adventure television series
Children's adventure television series
German children's television series
1988 Icelandic television series debuts
1989 Icelandic television series endings
1980s Icelandic television series
ZDF original programming
Television series about families
Television series set in the 1860s
Television shows based on children's books